The 1990–91 Purdue Boilermakers men's basketball team represented Purdue University during the 1990–91 college basketball season. Led by head coach Gene Keady, the Boilermakers earned the #7 seed in the Midwest Region of the NCAA tournament, but were defeated in the first round by Temple, finishing the season with a 17–12 record (9–9 Big Ten).

Roster

Schedule and results

|-
!colspan=6 style=| Non-conference regular season

|-
!colspan=6 style=| Big Ten Regular Season

|-
!colspan=6 style=| NCAA Tournament

Rankings

Team players drafted into the NBA

For the second consecutive year, a Purdue player was taken with the 39th overall pick.

References

Purdue Boilermarkers
Purdue
Purdue Boilermakers men's basketball seasons